A Bigger Splash is a 1973 British biographical documentary film about David Hockney's lingering breakup with his then-partner Peter Schlesinger, from 1970 to 1973. Directed by Jack Hazan and edited by David Mingay, it has music by Patrick Gowers. Featuring many of Hockney's circle, it includes designers Celia Birtwell and Ossie Clark, artist Patrick Procktor, gallery owner John Kasmin and museum curator Henry Geldzahler.

It is a fly-on-the-wall documentary, intercut with fictionalised and fantasy elements. It was groundbreaking and remains notable for its treatment of gay themes and its insights into his life and work during an important period in Hockney's life. The film takes its title from the 1967 painting A Bigger Splash, perhaps Hockney's best known Californian swimming pool picture. Hockney was initially shocked by its intimacy but later changed his mind.

See also

 Portrait of an Artist (Pool with Two Figures), 1972 Hockney painting featured in the film.

References

External links
 
 

1974 films
1974 documentary films
1970s avant-garde and experimental films
1970s biographical films
1973 LGBT-related films
1973 films
British avant-garde and experimental films
British biographical films
British documentary films
British LGBT-related films
David Hockney
Documentary films about gay men
Documentary films about painters
1970s English-language films
1970s British films